Antigua and Barbuda made its Paralympic Games début at the 2012 Summer Paralympics in London, sending a single representative (Jamol Pilgrim) to compete in athletics.

The Antigua and Barbuda Paralympic Committee (ABPC) was established on 15 March 2012. Its immediate purpose was to enable Pilgrim, "the nation's only Paralympic athlete", to compete at the 2012 Games, as this required his country having a National Paralympic Committee. Pilgrim had been a sprinter with Olympic aspirations until a car crash in 2009 had resulted in his right leg being amputated above the knee. Now running with a prosthetic, he met the 'A' standard qualifying time in 2011 to compete in London, in the men's 100m T42 sprint.

Full results for Antigua and Barbuda at the Paralympics

See also
 Antigua and Barbuda at the Olympics

References